The Output Festival is Dutch tri-annual music festival which focuses on experimental, contemporary electroacoustic music related to the electric guitar.

Editions

First edition

The first edition was from Friday 8th until Sunday 10 October 2004, located in the Paradiso and De Balie in Amsterdam. The program consisted of performances by Scott Johnson, Christian Wolff, Peter Adriaansz and Christopher Fox and also new performances of the work of Theo Loevendie, Steve Reich, Per Nørgård, Giacinto Scelsi and Frank Martin.

Plug 'n Play

One part of the festival is Plug 'n Play. On Sunday 10 October 60 guitarists played a piece by composer Gilius van Bergeijk directed by Otto Tausk.

Second edition

The second edition, with the subtitle soul of the tone, took place between the 28th and 30 September 2007.
The locations are Bimhuis and Muziekgebouw aan 't IJ, both in Amsterdam.

Performances:
The Wave of Chiel Meijering 
150 amateur guitarists playing with Jan Akkerman
 An improvisation performance by Fred Frith 
 A lecture by Yuri Landman

The second edition has NPS Radio 4 as its co-producer. 
The Festival is partnered by the Gaudeamus Foundation.

Third edition

The third edition is planned for 2010.

See also
List of electronic music festivals

References

External links
 www.outputfestival.com

Music festivals established in 2004
Improvisation
Gaudeamus Foundation
2004 establishments in the Netherlands
Music in Amsterdam
Electronic music festivals in the Netherlands
Electroacoustic music festivals